Xishan District is one of seven districts of the prefecture-level city of Kunming, the capital of Yunnan Province, Southwest China.

Xishan District occupies the western bank of Dian Lake. It takes its name from the Western Mountains (Xishan) located within the district.

Administrative divisions
Majie, Jinbi, Yongchang, Qianwei, Fuhai, Zongshuying and Xiyuan Sub-district Offices, Biji Town, Haikou Town and Tuanjie Town

Ethnic groups
The Xishan District Ethnic Gazetter (2009:22) lists the following ethnic Yi subgroups.
Nasu 纳苏 or Nasi 纳斯 (Black Yi 黑彝)
Suoni 索尼 or Suowei 索围 (White Yi 白彝)

Notable locations
 Kunming Haikou Industrial Park
 Kingdom of the Little People and World Butterfly Ecological Garden

References

External links 
Xishan District Official Website

County-level divisions of Kunming